The Hanabila Mosque or Darwish Pasha Mosque (also called Muzaffari Mosque), is an early Ayyubid-era mosque in Damascus, Syria.

See also
List of mosques in Damascus

References

13th-century mosques
Mosques in Damascus
Ayyubid mosques in Syria
13th-century establishments in the Ayyubid Sultanate
Mosques completed in 1213